This is a list of Kosovo national under-21 football team results. The team is considered to be the feeder team for the Kosovo national team.

History

Participations at qualifications

2019 UEFA European Under-21 Championship qualifications
On 26 January 2017, in Nyon, it was decided that Kosovo should be part in Group 5 of the 2019 UEFA European Under-21 Championship qualification, together with Azerbaijan, Germany, Israel, Norway and Republic of Ireland. On 25 March 2017, Kosovo made his debut on UEFA European Under-21 Championship qualifications with a 1–0 away defeat in against Republic of Ireland. On 29 July 2017, UEFA confirmed that the match in which Kosovo had lost with a deep score 0–5 against Norway was given as a 3–0 victory for Kosovo, this happened after in that match for Norway had played Kristoffer Ajer who was suspended. This match for Kosovo was the first victory in a qualifying match for a major tournament. Kosovo would secure another dramatic win against Norway at home with 3–2 by two goals from Enis Bytyqi and one from Florent Hasani, that was Kosovo's first home win in their history at this competition.

2021 UEFA European Under-21 Championship qualifications
On 11 December 2018, in Nyon, it was decided that Kosovo should be part in Group 3 of the 2021 UEFA European Under-21 Championship qualification, together with Albania, Andorra, Austria, England and Turkey. Before the start of this qualifying cycle, Kosovo in March 2019 played two friendly matches in Antalya with Turkmenistan which won with a narrow score of 3–2, and with Malta which won with a minimum score of 1–0, in the composition of Kosovo was the players who would potentially be part of the national team during the qualifying cycle. On 6 June 2019, Kosovo started the qualifying cycle against Andorra which they defeated with a deep score 4–0 and this match is their best result yet.

Fixtures and results

2010s

2013

2016

2017

2018

2019

2020s

2020

2021

2022

2023

2024

Notes and references

Notes

References

External links
 
Kosovo U21 News about the team

Under-21 (feeder) team